Curley is a surname, given name or nickname.

Curley may also refer to:

 Curley, Côte-d'Or, a French commune
 Curley (film), a 1947 film produced by Hal Roach
 Archbishop Curley High School, a private boys' school in Baltimore, Maryland

See also

Corley (disambiguation)
Cubley (disambiguation)
Culey (disambiguation)
Culley (disambiguation)
Curlee (disambiguation)
Curler (disambiguation)
Curli
Curly (disambiguation)
Curlew (disambiguation)
Curley v. NAMBLA
Bluey and Curley